WBRL-CD (channel 21) is a low-power, Class A television station in Baton Rouge, Louisiana, United States, airing programming from The CW. It is owned and operated by network majority owner Nexstar Media Group alongside Fox affiliate WGMB-TV (channel 44) and independent station KZUP-CD (channel 19); Nexstar also provides certain services to NBC affiliate WVLA-TV (channel 33) under joint sales and shared services agreements (JSA/SSA) with White Knight Broadcasting. The stations share studios on Perkins Road in Baton Rouge, while WBRL-CD's transmitter is located near Addis, Louisiana.

In addition to its own digital signal, WBRL-CD is simulcast in 720p high definition on WGMB's second digital subchannel (44.2) from the same transmitter site.

History
Communications Corporation of America brought WB programming to Baton Rouge cable subscribers on February 1, 1999, as WBBR, a cable-only station on Cox Communications channel 10 (WBBR's call sign was used in a fictitious manner). Previously, WB programming was available on WTVK-11, a low-power station owned by Gulf Atlantic Communications also affiliated with America One. TCI, however, did carry WGN irregularly between 1995 and 1999, making WB programming available to subscribers. Eventually, WTVK signed off, and channel 11 became occupied by KPBN-LP, an America One affiliate.

The station now known as WBRL signed on the air March 30, 1989, as K65EF on channel 65. It was founded by Woody Jenkins of Great Oaks Broadcasting Corporation and initially served as a translator for independent station WBTR, as that station initially had trouble getting picked up on local cable systems in the greater Baton Rouge area. In 1992, it became KANC-LP, channel 21 and served as Baton Rouge's first all-news station affiliated with the All News Channel. On November 13, 2002, WTNC was purchased by ComCorp with the objective of bringing WBBR/WB programming over-the air. The call sign was changed to WBRL and was initially supposed to be on channel 19 before Communications Corporation decided to put it on channel 21 (sister station KZUP-CD was on channel 19, but is now on channel 20; some station ids from 2002 erroneously branded the station as WB 19 instead of WB 21). WBRL was previously used as the call letters to the FM counterpart to WJBO-AM from 1941 to 1958—this station is now WYNK-FM and is unrelated to WBRL-CD.

On March 7, 2006, Baton Rouge's UPN affiliate, WBXH, announced that they would take affiliation with MyNetworkTV in September. On March 9, 2006, it was announced that WBRL would affiliate with The CW.

In June 2006, owner ComCorp filed for Chapter 11 bankruptcy protection. ComCorp said in a press release viewers and staff would see no changes at the station.

On April 24, 2013, ComCorp announced the sale of its entire group, including WGMB and WBRL-CD, to the Nexstar Broadcasting Group. The local marketing agreement for WVLA and KZUP-CD (which is retaining ownership with White Knight Broadcasting) is included in the deal. The sale was completed on January 1, 2015.

On December 3, 2018, Nexstar announced it would acquire the assets of Chicago-based Tribune Media for $6.4 billion in cash and debt. The deal—which would make Nexstar the largest television station operator by total number of stations upon its expected closure late in the third quarter of 2019—would give the WBRL/KZUP/WGMB/WVLA virtual quadropoly sister stations in Tribune's legal duopoly of ABC affiliate WGNO and CW affiliate WNOL-TV in New Orleans.  On July 1, 2020, WBRL relocated its digital channel from channel 21 to channel 20 to prevent co-interference from WHNO in New Orleans, sharing channel space with its sister station, KZUP. On November 1, 2021, WBRL's simulcast on WGMB-DT2 was upgraded to 720p high definition.

Programming
Syndicated programming on WBRL-CD includes The King of Queens, 2 Broke Girls, Two and a Half Men, How I Met Your Mother, The Middle, Dish Nation, The Steve Wilkos Show, and The Jerry Springer Show. The station airs The CW's entire programming lineup with little to no preemptions or deviations. Since March 2017, WBRL has reaired the 9 p.m. newscast from WGMB at 10:30 p.m.

Subchannel

References

External links

Television stations in Baton Rouge, Louisiana
Television channels and stations established in 1989
Low-power television stations in the United States
Nexstar Media Group
1989 establishments in Louisiana
The CW affiliates